The Battle of Mimigawa was a battle, fought in Japan, between the Ōtomo clan and the Shimazu clan in 1578.  The Ōtomo force was led by Sorin's brother-in-law Tawara Chikataka, while the Shimazu clan was led by Shimazu Yoshihisa.

Prelude
In May 1578, the Shimazu had been advancing north from their Satsuma Province, when Ōtomo Sōrin (retired daimyō) and his heir 
Yoshimune, moved south to confront them. The Christian Ōtomo army destroyed Buddhist and Shinto religious buildings along the way. Later, The Ōtomo crossed the Mimigawa and laid siege to Takajo Castle on 20 October, The Takajo garrison only have 500 men led by Yamada Arinobu. The Ōtomo set up their Portuguese cannon, kunikuzuri or "destroyer of provinces", across the Kiribaragawa. The castle was soon reinforced by 1000 men under Yoshihisa's younger brother, Shimazu Iehisa.  

Shimazu Toshihisa was able to ambush some Ōtomo troops and follow the survivors to their headquarters at Matsuyama.

Shimazu Yoshihisa had a dream the night before the battle, which he turned into a poem, and the Shimazu considered a good omen:

Battle
The Shimazu used their favorite decoy tactic, used 8 times from 1527 to 1600.  In the center of their army as decoy was Shimazu Yoshihiro, with Shimazu Tadahira and Shimazu Tadamune on his flanks, and Shimazu Yoshihisa in reserve.  

The Ōtomo army in the center, led by Tagita Shigekane and Saeki Korenori, were led on by the Shimazu false retreat, across the Takajogawa, into the Shimazu trap. Shimazu Iehisa and Yamada Arinobu sallied from Takajo castle and attacked the Otomo army from the rear. 

Otomo's general, Tawara Chikataka fled while Tagita Shigekane, Saeki Karenori, Yoshioka Akioki and Tsunokuma Sekiso were killed in battle. The bodies of the Otomo army littered the 25 km back to the Mimigawa in their retreat and pursuit by the Shimazu army.

According to Fabian Fucan, Shimazu used the battle to warn other daimyōs not to abandon the Buddhist religion.

References

Shimazu clan
Battles of the Sengoku period
1578 in Japan
Conflicts in 1578